Fort Perch Rock is a former defence installation situated at the mouth of Liverpool Bay in New Brighton. Built in the 1820s to defend the Port of Liverpool, its function has changed from defensive, to tourist attraction and museum. It has been used as a venue for musical concerts and has been listed as a Grade II* Listed Building. The Fort's cafe "The Mess" is open daily from 9am. A new World War 2 escape room concept "Escape The Fort" runs within the fort.

History
Fort Perch Rock is a coastal defence battery built between 1825 and 1829, with the foundation stone being laid in 1826. It was built to protect the Port of Liverpool and proposed as a fortified lighthouse to replace the old Perch Rock Light; however, a separate lighthouse was built. The fort was built on an area known as Black Rock, and was cut off at high tide. However, coastal reclamation has made it fully accessible.

It was built with red sandstone from the Runcorn quarries. The Fort originally had a drawbridge, and a Tuscan portal which bore the coat of arms and the words 'Fort Perch Rock'. At one point it was armed with 18 guns, of which 16 were 32-pounders, mounted on platforms. It was nicknamed the 'Little Gibraltar of the Mersey'.

The foundation stone reads:
This foundation stone of the Rock Perch Battery, projected by and under the direction of John Sikes Kitson, Esquire, Captain in the Royal Engineers, for the defence of the port was laid on 31st March 1826 by Peter Bourne, Esquire, Mayor of Liverpool in the 7th year of the reign of His Majesty George IV. His Grace, the Duke of Wellington , Master General of the Ordnance.

The projected cost of building was £27,065.0s.8d. Kitson ensured that this budget was not exceeded, finishing the fort for a total cost of £26,965.0s.8d.

Modern use
In the late 1970s, the fort could be hired as a party venue. During this time Orchestral Manoeuvres in the Dark founder members Andy McCluskey and Paul Humphreys played there as members of the short lived Wirral group The Id. Since the 1990s, the fort has played host to various musical events including, in the summer of 2006, a number of rock concerts which were organised by a group of young Wallaseyans. The nights were called "Nautical" and were featured in The Guardian newspaper and named The NME club of the week for the 1 September 2006 show, which featured British Sea Power and the Tiny Dancers.

The fort features a museum with displays including military aviation, maritime history, and the Fort Perch Rock Marine Radio Museum used to exhibit marine wireless communications devices. The museum is currently being refurbished and will reopen in Spring 2023.

A new permanent escape room concept "Escape The Fort" opened in 2022 and is available for bookings daily.

In spring 2022, The Mess cafe opened within the Fort and is open daily from 9am.

In Literature and the Arts

In the poetical illustration 'The Black-Rock Fort and Lighthouse', by Letitia Elizabeth Landon  to an engraving of a painting by Samuel Austin, she imagines the beacon light as a welcoming sight to voyagers returning home to England.

Gallery

See also
Listed buildings in New Brighton, Merseyside
Seaforth Battery
Fort Crosby

References

Bibliography

External links

Fort Perch Rock's website 

Perch Rock, Fort
Forts in Merseyside
Museums in Merseyside
Telecommunications museums in the United Kingdom
New Brighton, Merseyside
Buildings and structures in the Metropolitan Borough of Wirral
Military and war museums in England